Cosmos FC is  a Barbadian football club based in Speightstown, the second largest city in the country. As of 2019 it competes in the Barbados Division Two, the nation's third-tier league.

History
The club was re-established in 1990 by Basil Harewood. It has gone on to place well in national competitions and produce players for the Barbados youth and senior national teams. In 2013 the club was promoted to the Barbados Premier League before being relegated the following season. In 2018 the club competed in the Barbados Division Two. The following season Cosmos FC competed in the inaugural Capelli Super Cup. During the 2019 season, the club was promoted back to Division Two.

Domestic history
Key

References

External links
Global Sports Archive profile
Soccerway profile
National Football Teams profile

Football clubs in Barbados